Heather Linstad (born February 26, 1963) is an American ice hockey coach, best known for coaching the UConn Huskies women's ice hockey program during 2000 to 2013 and the Connecticut Whale of the Premier Hockey Federation (PHF) during the 2015–16 and 2016–17 seasons.

Coaching career
Prior to beginning her coaching career, she was a college ice hockey player for the Providence Friars women's ice hockey team and was honored as the ECAC Player of the Year in 1989. She was then head coach for eight seasons at Northeastern Huskies from 1992 to 2000, winning the ECAC coach of the year 1994. In 2000, Linstad became the women's ice hockey coach at the University of Connecticut, coaching the Connecticut Huskies for thirteen seasons. On February 13, 2010, Linstad obtained her 300th win as a head coach, with a 4–1 over her alma mater, the Providence Friars. Linstad abruptly resigned from her coaching position at the University of Connecticut on March 13, 2013, after two poor seasons. In 2016, she would be awarded the Women's Hockey Founders Award by the American Hockey Coaches Association for her contributions to the growth and development of women's ice hockey in the United States.

Linstad was the head coach of the United States U-18 women's ice hockey team through the 2011–12 season, coaching the team to a silver medal finish at the 2012 IIHF World Women's U18 Championship.

On January 29, 2016, Lindstad was named as head coach of the Connecticut Whale of the National Women's Hockey League. She left the team after the 2016–17 season.

Controversy
A lawsuit filed against the University of Connecticut alleges Linstad dismissed a female hockey player from the team for not being stable enough following an alleged on-campus sexual assault by a male hockey player in 2011.

Coaching statistics

References

Living people
UConn Huskies women's ice hockey coaches
American ice hockey coaches
People from Chelmsford, Massachusetts
Providence Friars women's ice hockey players
American women's ice hockey centers
Northeastern Huskies women's ice hockey coaches
1967 births
Premier Hockey Federation coaches
Chelmsford High School alumni
Sportspeople from Middlesex County, Massachusetts